Teguh Amiruddin (born 13 August 1993) is an Indonesian professional footballer who plays as a goalkeeper for Liga 1 club Arema. He is also a second sergeant in the Indonesian Army.

Club career

Barito Putera
On 10 November 2014, he moved to Barito Putera.

TIRA-Persikabo
On 1 April 2016, he was signed for TIRA-Persikabo to play in ISC A in the 2016 season. He played there for 4 seasons.

Arema
He was signed for Arema to play in Liga 1 in the 2020 season. He made his league debut on 2 March 2020 in a match against TIRA-Persikabo at the Pakansari Stadium, Cibinong.

International career 
Teguh made his debut for the Indonesia U-23 on 30 March 2014 against Sri Lanka U-23 in the friendly match.

Career statistics

Club

Honours

Club
Perseru Serui
Liga Indonesia Premier Division runner up: 2013

Arema
Indonesia President's Cup: 2022

References

External links 
 
 Teguh Amiruddin at Liga Indonesia

1993 births
Living people
Sportspeople from Malang
Sportspeople from East Java
Indonesian footballers
Liga 2 (Indonesia) players
Liga 1 (Indonesia) players
Perseru Serui players
Arema F.C. players
Persikabo 1973 players
Badak Lampung F.C. players
PS Barito Putera players
Indonesia youth international footballers
Footballers at the 2014 Asian Games
Association football goalkeepers
Asian Games competitors for Indonesia